The CS 22 is a Canadian trailerable sailboat, that was designed by John A. Butler and first built in 1971. The design is out of production.

Production
The boat was built by CS Yachts in Canada. The company produced 500 CS 22s between 1971 and 1976, when production ended.

Design

The CS 22 is a small recreational sailboat, built predominantly of fibreglass, with wood trim. It has a fractional sloop rig, a transom-hung rudder and a retractable centreboard with a stub keel. It displaces  and carries  of ballast.

The design has sleeping accommodation for four people, with a double "V"-berth in the bow cabin, a drop-down dinette table berth and a quarter berth on the starboard side, aft. The galley is located on the starboard side just forward of the companionway ladder. The galley is equipped with a two-burner stove and a sink. The is a small hanging lock forward of the galley. The head under the bow "V"- berth and is a portable type.

Operational history
In a 2010 review Steve Henkel wrote, "British naval architect John Butler was asked by Canadian Sailcraft Co. (CS) to draw a small trailerable sailboat 'suitable for light-weather performance.” The centerboard is pivoted in a slot in an unusually stubby external ballast keel, which lowers the center of gravity for added stability, keeps the board from encroaching on cabin space, and, it is said, takes the weight of the boat when she is trailered or stored. But we wonder whether the boat can be balanced on her stub keel when grounded by a falling tide. Best features: Except for the rudderhead rising above the deck aft, her sleek looks seem better than average to us. Worst features: The boat has shallow ballast and slack bilges, which may provide low wetted surface for light-air speed but will also make her more tender than average. The centerboard slot in the keel, open on the aft edge to house the board when up, may cause
eddies, which will tend to slow the boat down, The vertical lifting rudder slides up and down in an aluminum frame.
It is supposed to shear a retaining pin and swing aft if it hits an underwater object. Like many complicated designs
at sea, it may or may not work when you need it most. Why not just a conventional swivel?"

See also
List of sailing boat types

Similar sailboats
Buccaneer 220
Capri 22
Catalina 22
DS-22
Edel 665
Falmouth Cutter 22
Hunter 22
J/22
Marlow-Hunter 22
Marshall 22
Pearson Electra
Pearson Ensign
Ranger 22
Santana 22
Seaward 22
Spindrift 22
Starwind 223
Tanzer 22
Triton 22
US Yachts US 22

References

External links

Keelboats
Trailer sailers
1970s sailboat type designs
Sailing yachts
Sailboat type designs by John A. Butler
Sailboat types built by CS Yachts